Hoplolaimus indicus is a plant pathogenic nematode affecting pearl millet.

See also 
 List of pearl millet diseases

References

External links 
 Nemaplex, University of California - Hoplolaimus indicus
  H.indicus an ectoparasitic nematode pathogenic to Citrus in India
 Hoplolaimus indicus

Tylenchida
Agricultural pest nematodes
Pearl millet diseases
Fauna of Pakistan
Nematodes described in 1963